Stites Township is located in St. Clair County, Illinois. As of the 2010 census, its population was 749 and it contained 326 housing units.  Stites Township was originally named Brooklyn Township when it was reorganized from a portion of East St. Louis Township in February, 1888. Its name was changed to Stites in April, 1888.

Geography

Demographics

References

External links
City-data.com
St. Clair County Official Site
Illinois State Archives

Townships in St. Clair County, Illinois
Townships in Illinois